Grosse Pointe Public Library is a public library system serving the Grosse Pointe area of Wayne County, Michigan.

The Carolyn and Ted Ewald Memorial Branch Library in Grosse Pointe Park was scheduled to open in 2004. The  branch was originally scheduled to open in October of that year, but delays moved the opening month to January 2005.

The library owns a mobile made by Alexander Calder. In July 2015 it was appraised to be worth $10 million.

Branches
The system has three branches:
 Central Branch (Grosse Pointe Farms)
 Ewald Branch (Grosse Pointe Park)
 Woods Branch (Grosse Pointe Woods)

References

External links

 Grosse Pointe Public Library

Library buildings completed in 2005
Public libraries in Michigan
Education in Wayne County, Michigan